Pethia aurea is a species of cyprinid fish where it is found in sluggish streams in West Bengal, India.  This species can reach a length of  SL.

References 

Pethia
Fish of India
Fish described in 2013